USS Alcor may refer to the following ships of the United States Navy:

 , a destroyer tender
  a Victory ship laid down in 1944

United States Navy ship names